The Volkswagen Jetta (A2) is a compact car, the second generation of the Volkswagen Jetta and the successor to the Volkswagen Jetta (A1). The Mark 2 series is the longest running Jetta so far. Introduced to Europe in early 1984 and to North America in 1985, the second generation Jetta proved to be a sales success for Volkswagen. The car secured the title of best-selling European car in North America, Farmer's Journal COTY 1991 and outsold the similar Golf by two-to-one in that market. Based on the all new second generation Golf platform, the car was larger, heavier, and could seat five people instead of four as in the Mark 1. Exterior dimensions increased in all directions. The suspension setup was basically unchanged from the first generation, although refined slightly, for example by the inclusion of a separate subframe for mounting the front control arms to help noise isolation, as well as improved rubber mountings for all components. Aerodynamics improved considerably, with a drag coefficient of 0.36. With a 470-litre (16.6 ft3) luggage compartment, the trunk had grown nearly as large as some full-sized American sedans. Interior room was also increased 14%, which changed the EPA class from sub-compact to compact.

Cars built in Germany were assembled in a brand new (at the time) plant at Wolfsburg in Assembly Hall 54. The plant was heavily robotised in an effort to make build quality more consistent. New innovations on the second generation included an optional trip computer (referred to as the MFA, German Multi-Funktions-Anzeige), as well as silicone dampened engine and transmission mounts to reduce noise, vibration, and harshness levels. In 1988, a more advanced fully electronic fuel injection system became available. This arrangement is known as the Digifant engine management system.

Like the Mark 1, the second generation was offered as a two-door or four-door sedan. External changes throughout the series' run were few: the front-quarter windows were eliminated in 1988 (along with a grille and door trim change), and larger body-colored bumpers and lower side skirts were added from 1990.

In 2007, Volkswagen of America held a contest to find the diesel-powered Volkswagen with the highest distance traveled on the original engine. The winning car was a 1986 Jetta Turbodiesel found in Blue Rock, Ohio which had . A local dealer verified the odometer reading. Notable on this particular car was that it also had the original muffler despite being located in an area subject to road salt in the winter.

Safety and security

In a crash test conducted by the US National Highway Traffic Safety Administration, the Jetta received three out of five stars for both driver and passenger protection in a 56 km/h (35 mph) frontal crash test. The Highway Loss Data Institute (part of the Insurance Institute for Highway Safety) found the injury and collision losses for the Jetta to be among the best of the small 4-door sedan category. It was topped only by the Golf. These cars suffered an especially high rate of radio theft; The radio's slide-out mount made it easy to remove quickly, and radios thus stolen were readily compatible with numerous other German cars. To correct the problem, VW redesigned the radios such that when their power supply was interrupted, they would not work once power was restored until a unit-specific code would be entered. Dealerships had access to a code database, and could provide a lost code by radio serial number once legitimate ownership was proven.

North America

The North American-market Jettas were substantially similar to the European model, with changes mostly driven by differences between American and European regulations covering vehicle safety and exhaust emissions, which necessitated different bumpers, headlamps and other lights, side-view mirrors, and seat belts. 

North American models in general had a narrower range of specification available. Most North American models came standard-equipped with items optional in Europe such as a larger engine, full console, door panel pockets, velour seating, power steering, height-adjustable steering column, and tachometer. The North American models also lacked some higher level options of European variants. The Jetta was perceived as slightly upmarket from the Golf. The level of features was always a step above the Golf, with examples such as standard passive restraint in 1988, standard power steering in 1990, and 14-inch wheels available for most years.

Canadian-market models were better equipped than U.S. models; generally, the Canadian base models received the same level of options as an American GL, and the same with the GL and Carat. Diesel engines, both naturally aspirated and turbocharged, were available for all years in Canada; in the U.S. there was no diesel option for 1988, and only a non-turbo option for 1989 and 1990. Canadians could get a 2-door model for 1992 (it was dropped after 1991 in the U.S.). The early Carat model with heated velour sport seats, a GLi engine, and optional automatic transmission, and there were also color and trim differences between Canadian and U.S. models.

Testing and review
The car received generally positive reviews, with critics praising the car's excellent handling, as well as a roomier interior compared to the last generation. Stiff shifting manual transmissions were a downside, and braking worked reasonably well although some brake fade was evident in the lower trim lines equipped with solid discs in front and drums in back. A number of reviews noted that the ride was stiff and busy, even though it did have good control typical of German cars. Despite additional sound insulation, road noise was evident especially on coarse pavement. In top sport trim (sometimes called the GLI or GTX), some reviewers noted the car was a less expensive alternative to a BMW or Audi. The sport trim added larger wheels, a stiffer suspension, and closer ratios on the manual transmission. From mid-1987 the Mark 2 GLI was offered with a 16-valve Twin-cam 1.8-litre engine, and was upgraded in early 1990 with the newer Mark 2 body style to a 2.0-litre 16-valve power plant (in North America).

IRVW 3
The IRVW 3 ("Integrated Research Volkswagen") was a 1983–1984 research study based on the not yet released Jetta II. In appearance it looked like nothing more than a slightly sporting Jetta, but it was packed with highly refined technology for its time. It was essentially a feasibility study for newly developed technology such as Anti-lock braking system and electric power steering. A number of functions were computer controlled, such as the overdrive gear for its four-speed manual gearbox. The IRVW 3 also had a pneumatic suspension which automatically lowered the car when the speed surpassed .

Worldwide production
Besides the Volkswagen production base in Germany, this generation was produced in a number of other countries, including Brazil, China, Nigeria, Mexico, South Africa, USA, and the former Yugoslavia.

China 

The first known Jetta in China was the A2 model that was used as a passenger car and a taxicab. 

The A2 was then given a facelift in April 1997 where it was known as the Jetta King. Available engines were a 1.6 litre petrol engine called the EA113 for civilian cars and a 1.9 litre diesel engine only available for taxi models. A 4-speed manual gearbox was standard, which could be replaced by a 5-speed manual gearbox, and then a 4-speed automatic gearbox was made available from November 1998. For 2002, the Jetta King was facelifted with a new exterior. Trim levels consisted of the AT, ATF, Avantgarde, CDX, CiF, CiX, CT, GDF, GiF, GT, GTI, GTX and Meeresbrise. This model was also converted into a 2-door pickup truck in limited numbers. 

The A2 was facelifted again in March 2010 with the same engines used by its predecessor; it was known as the Jetta Pioneer. This version of the Jetta was not offered in different trim levels and was a single model for the Chinese market. A2-based Jetta production ended in March 2013 where it was replaced by an independent model called the Jetta Night and the new model exclusive to China was developed based on the Volkswagen Group A05+ platform.

Engines

See also
Volkswagen Golf Mk2
Volkswagen Jetta (China)

References

Jetta 2
Compact cars
Front-wheel-drive vehicles
Sedans
Cars introduced in 1984
1990s cars
Cars discontinued in 2013